Five star, 5 star or ***** may refer to:

Quality grading system
Five star grade in a Star (classification) system, such as for films, TV shows, restaurants, and hotels
Hotel rating
Restaurant rating
UEFA stadium categories

Arts and entertainment

Music
Five Star, a British pop/R&B group, formed in 1983 
Five Star (album), by Five Star (1990)
The Five Stars, a Samoan musical group
The Five Stars, a 1950s American vocal group, with "Atom Bomb Baby" featured in The Atomic Cafe and Fallout 4
Five-star (album), by Yuki (2007)
Five Stars (Myname album), 2014
 Five Stars (Higher Brothers album)
"5 Star" (Yo Gotti song) (2009)

Film, radio and television
Five Star (film), a 2002 Indian Tamil film
Five Star Production, a Thai film production company
5Star, a UK TV channel owned by ViacomCBS
The Five Star Stories, a series of 1986 manga

Computer games
 SSI's Five Star series of wargames, of which Panzer General was the first

Businesses and organisations

Politics
Five Star Movement, a political party in Italy
Flag of China, a five-star red flag

Businesses
5Star, a British digital television channel
Five Star Bank (disambiguation), several American commercial banks
Five Star Bus Company, in the Philippines
Five Star Publishing, the fiction imprint of Gale (publisher)
Five Star brand school supplies, a division of ACCO Brands

Places
Five Star Island, Bermuda
Five Star Trail, a trail alongside the Southwestern Pennsylvania Railroad, U.S.

Sport
5 Star Wrestling, a Scottish professional wrestling company

Other uses
Five-star rank, a very senior military rank
5 Star (chocolate), a chocolate bar produced by Cadburys

See also
Five-pointed star
V Star (disambiguation)

Flag of China, also known as the Five-star Red Flag
"Five stars rising in the East" armband, an Eastern Han (25–220) to Western Jin (265–316) era Sichuan brocade armband